Attorney General Carter may refer to:

Henry A. P. Carter (1837–1891), Attorney General of the Kingdom of Hawaii
Pamela Carter (born 1949), Attorney General of Indiana
Steve Carter (Indiana politician) (born 1954), Attorney General of Indiana

See also
Attorney General McCarter (disambiguation)